Gordon Hugh Willis Jr.,  (May 28, 1931 – May 18, 2014) was an American cinematographer and film director. He is best known for his photographic work on eight Woody Allen films (including Annie Hall and Manhattan), six Alan J. Pakula films (including All the President's Men), four James Bridges films, and all three films from Francis Ford Coppola's The Godfather series.

Fellow cinematographer William A. Fraker called Willis's work a "milestone in visual storytelling", while one critic suggested that Willis "defined the cinematic look of the 1970s: sophisticated compositions in which bolts of light and black put the decade's moral ambiguities into stark relief". When the International Cinematographers Guild conducted a survey in 2003, they placed Willis among the ten most influential cinematographers in history.

Career

Early life and beginnings
Willis was born in Astoria, Queens, New York. His parents had been dancers in Broadway theatre before his father became a makeup man at Warner Bros. in Brooklyn. As a child, Willis fell in love with films. He wanted to be an actor and then became interested in lighting and stage design, later turning to photography. For a time he intended to be a fashion photographer, photographing models he knew from living in Greenwich Village. "I didn't know shit," Willis said, "[I was] dumber than dirt, as they say. No money, no jobs etc." Through contacts of his father's he worked as a "gofer" on various movies in New York.

During the Korean War, Willis served in the Air Force, managing to join the Photographic and Charting Service in a motion picture unit. "I spent four years learning everything I could about making movies," Willis said. After leaving the Air Force a friend helped him to join the East Coast union in New York and he started to work as an assistant cameraman, working his way up to become a first cameraman about thirteen years later. He worked in advertising, shooting numerous commercials, and made a number of documentaries, a discipline that strongly influenced his later style. "You learn to eliminate, as opposed to adding," Willis said of his time making documentaries. "Not many people understand that."

He was a camera operator on the feature documentary Windjammer (1958) filmed in Cinemiracle.

Willis once stated: "I'm a mimimalist. I see things in simple ways ... It's human nature to define complexity as better. Well, it's not." In 1969, director Aram Avakian hired Willis to work on his film End of the Road. This was Willis' first movie.

Making films
Willis went on to work for some of the most acclaimed directors of what is now seen as a golden age of American film-making. He captured America's urban paranoia in three films he shot with Alan J. Pakula: Klute (1971), The Parallax View (1974) and All The President's Men (1976). He collaborated with Hal Ashby on The Landlord (1970), James Bridges on The Paper Chase (1973), and Herbert Ross on Pennies From Heaven (1981); as well as shooting all three of Coppola's Godfather films and working with Woody Allen on a succession of films that included Annie Hall (1977) and Manhattan (1979).

At a seminar on film-making he gave in 2003, Willis said, "It's hard to believe, but a lot of directors have no visual sense. They only have a storytelling sense. If a director is smart, he'll give me the elbow room to paint". He added: "It's the judgment they're paying for." In a later interview he explained that when he started out in films he "did things in visual structure that nobody in the business was doing, especially in Hollywood", explaining: "I wasn't trying to be different; I just did what I liked". When asked by the interviewer how he applied his style to different genres and to working with different directors, Willis answered: "You're looking for a formula; there is none. The formula is me."

Up to the making of The Godfather (1972), Willis mostly used Mitchell reflex cameras with Baltar or Cooke lenses.  After that he used Panavision equipment, which he had first used on Klute. Willis went back to using Mitchells on The Godfather Part II (1974), in order to retain the visual coherence of the two films. Asked in 2004 about shooting films digitally, he was skeptical: "The organics aren't the same," he said. "The interpretive levels suffer", adding: "Digital is another form of recording an image, but it won't replace thinking."

Collaboration with Francis Ford Coppola
Originally, Willis turned down the first two Godfather films, until Coppola told him they would not look the same without him. His work turned out to be groundbreaking in its use of low-light photography and underexposed film, as well as in his control of lighting and exposure to create the sepia tones that denoted period scenes in The Godfather Part II. His contributions carefully strengthened the themes of the story, as when shooting Marlon Brando with his eyes hooded in shadow, a piece of lighting design that followed from the fact that Brando's make-up had to be lit from above.

Willis said that it was the color that stitched the Godfather films together. The visual structure of the films was, he said, his, but he gave Coppola credit for hiring him, saying: "I'm not that easy to deal with". He praised the director for the "management hell" of his struggles with Paramount, adding that he was "grateful he could separate the visual structure of these movies from the mess that went on to fashion them".

Collaboration with Woody Allen 

Willis' collaboration with Woody Allen began with Annie Hall (1977). Willis described making films with Allen as being so comfortable that it was like "working with your hands in your pockets". On Annie Hall he contrasted the warmth of Annie and Alvy Singer's romance in New York with the overexposure of the film's California scenes, while in Allen's Manhattan he was responsible for what has been called a "richly textured black-and-white paean to the beauty and diversity of the city itself". Willis, whose idea it was to use anamorphic widescreen for the filming, said: "We both felt that New York was a black-and-white city".

Willis also worked on the Allen films Interiors (1978), Stardust Memories (1980), A Midsummer Night's Sex Comedy (1982), Zelig (1983), Broadway Danny Rose (1984), and The Purple Rose of Cairo (1985). Allen said that working with Willis had helped to improve his technical skills, saying of him: "He's an artist. He's got a great sense of humor--he taught me a lot."

Academy Awards
In the seven-year period up to 1977, Willis was the director of photography on six films that received among them 39 Academy Award nominations, winning 19 times, including three awards for Best Picture. The fact that Willis did not receive a single nomination was a subject of some controversy. His frequent absence from this period's nominees has been ascribed both to his unhidden "antipathy for Hollywood" and his work being ahead of its time. He was once quoted as saying of Hollywood, "I don't think it suffers from an overabundance of good taste".  Willis was later nominated twice, once for his recreation of 1920s photography in Woody Allen's Zelig (1983), and then for The Godfather Part III (1990). In 2009, at the inaugural Governors Awards, the Academy chose Willis as the recipient of the Academy Honorary Award for his life's work.

Directing and retirement
Willis directed one film of his own, Windows, in 1980. He admitted the film had been a mistake, and later said of directing that he didn't really like it. "I've had a good relationship with actors," he reflected, "but I can do what I do and back off. I don't want that much romancing. I don't want them to call me up at two in the morning saying, 'I don't know who I am'".  He was nominated for the Golden Raspberry Award for Worst Director one year after the film's release.

His last film was The Devil's Own (1997), directed by Pakula. Of his decision to retire, Willis said: "I got tired of trying to get actors out of trailers, and standing in the rain".

Death
Willis died of cancer on May 18, 2014, ten days before his 83rd birthday, in North Falmouth, Massachusetts. ASC president Richard Crudo said: "He was one of the giants who absolutely changed the way movies looked. Up until the time of The Godfather and The Godfather Part II, nothing previously shot looked that way. He changed the way films looked and the way people looked at films."

Legacy
Willis's work became celebrated for his ability to use shadow and underexposed film with a "subtlety and expressivity previously unknown on color film stock", with one critic citing as examples Don Corleone's study in The Godfather and a parking garage in All the President's Men. Willis's friend, cinematographer Conrad Hall, named him "The Prince of Darkness" but Willis himself preferred to talk in terms of "visual relativity", saying: "I like going from light to dark, dark to light, big to small, small to big". Discussing The Godfather he said:"You can decide this movie has got a dark palette. But you can't spend two hours on a dark palette. . . So you've got this high-key, Kodachrome wedding going on. Now you go back inside and it's dark again. You can't, in my mind, put both feet into a bucket of cement and leave them there for the whole movie. It doesn't work. You must have this relativity."

Director Francis Ford Coppola said of Willis, "He has a natural sense of structure and beauty, not unlike a Renaissance artist," while Willis was praised for his capacity to use "painterliness" to define "not just the look but the very meaning and feel of a film". Speaking of contemporary film-making in 2004, Willis said:"I'm delighted that people can fly, dogs can talk, and anything destructive can be fashioned on the screen, but much of what's being done lacks structure or taste. As I've asked in the past: can anyone give me the definition of a camera? It's a tool, a means to an end. So is a light, and everything else you can pile on your back. They're all meant to transpose the written word into moving pictures that tell a story."

Filmography

Awards and nominations

References

External links

Gordon Willis at Find a Grave
Radio show (with transcript) Gordon Willis retrospective on NPR

1931 births
2014 deaths
People from Queens, New York
Academy Honorary Award recipients
American cinematographers
Deaths from cancer in Massachusetts
Burials at Massachusetts National Cemetery